Muhammad Khan Baloch is a Pakistani politician who was a Member of the Provincial Assembly of the Punjab, from March 2014 to May 2018.

Early life
He was born on 1 January 1946 in Jhang.

Political career

He was elected to the Provincial Assembly of the Punjab as a candidate of Pakistan Muslim League (Nawaz) from Constituency PP-81 (Jhang-V-Cum-Chiniot) in by-polls held in March 2014.

References

Living people
Punjab MPAs 2013–2018
1946 births
Pakistan Muslim League (N) politicians